João Maurício Fernandes Salgueiro (4 September 1934 – 17 February 2023) was a Portuguese economist and politician. A member of the Social Democratic Party, he served as Minister of Finance from 1981 to 1983.

Salgueiro died on 17 February 2023, at the age of 88.

References

1934 births
2023 deaths
Portuguese economists
Social Democratic Party (Portugal) politicians
Finance ministers of Portugal
Grand Crosses of the Order of Prince Henry
Technical University of Lisbon alumni
People from Braga
20th-century Portuguese politicians